Melanocenchris is a genus of Asian and African plants in the grass family.

 Species
 Melanocenchris abyssinica (R.Br. ex Fresen.) Hochst. - Chad, Sudan, Egypt, Eritrea, Ethiopia, Somalia, Saudi Arabia, Oman, Persian Gulf Sheikdoms, Iran, Pakistan, India
 Melanocenchris jacquemontii Jaub. & Spach - India, Pakistan, Bangladesh, Iraq, Socotra
 Melanocenchris monoica (Rottler) C.E.C.Fisch. - India, Sri Lanka

References

Chloridoideae
Poaceae genera
Grasses of Africa
Grasses of Asia
Taxa named by Christian Gottfried Daniel Nees von Esenbeck